Daniel Davis was the Solicitor General for the Commonwealth of Massachusetts. He represented the First Church and Parish in Dedham in the case of Baker v. Fales.

Notes

Works cited

19th-century American lawyers
Solicitors General of Massachusetts
Year of birth missing
Year of death missing